Carsten Jens Maschmeyer (born 8 May 1959) is a German billionaire businessman, investor, and panel member of the German investment television series Die Höhle der Löwen ("The Lions' Den"). He is the founder and owner of the Maschmeyer Group which combines all of his current business activities. Through ALSTIN (Alternative Strategic Investments) he invests growth capital in emerging industries and future markets with outstanding innovations in sectors like the Internet, technology, and life sciences. Through Paladin Asset Management, his team undertakes value investments in publicly listed companies. Through Seed & Speed, Maschmeyer provides seed investments to very early-stage companies.

Early life
Born in Bremen, Germany, Maschmeyer grew up in Hildesheim (Lower Saxony) and had a deprived childhood. He never saw his father and lived in an orphanage. He has one half-brother, whom he first met at the age of 40. As a teenager, he was a successful athlete (middle-distance-runner). In 1978, he completed his Abitur (higher-education entrance qualification) and joined the German Armed Forces for two years. To fund his university courses in medicine in Hanover, he worked part time in the sales department of a financial advisory firm (OVB Vermögensberatung) before becoming a full-time financial consultant in 1982, leaving the university without a degree. He became director of the Lower Saxony division at a very young age, responsible for approximately 3,000 people. He worked at OVB until 1987.
Carsten Maschmeyer is a reserve officer of the Joint Medical Service of the Bundeswehr.

Career
In 1988, Carsten Maschmeyer established an independent financial advisory for individuals by founding the AWD (Allgemeiner Wirtschaftsdienst) financial group. His company grew rapidly and became Europe's largest independent financial advisory. It went public in 2000, rising in the M-DAX (member of the 100 listed companies) as well as expanding into 11 countries employing approximately 11,000 people. It managed €15 billion (US$22 billion) for 2 million customers in 2007. In 2007, Swiss Life, the largest Swiss Life Insurance provider, bought all shares in the company for CHF 1,9 billion (approx. US$2.1 billion).

Investments
Maschmeyer presently maintains significant holdings in a variety of companies. In a recent study about the fastest growing startups in Germany, his private equity fund is the only one invested in two companies that were ranked in the top 10. Maschmeyer is number 112 in the list of the 500 richest Germans. His assets are estimated at €1.2 billion (approx. US$1.3 billion).

HMNC Brain Health
HMNC Brain Health (HMNC) specializes in developing diagnoses of and therapies for depression and anxiety disorders. Together with partners from academia, the company uses prominent research results to generate groundbreaking and marketable concepts. The company was founded by Professor Florian Holsboer and Maschmeyer in December 2010 and is based in Munich, Bavaria. Both founders want to improve the treatment of depression and anxiety disorders.

Syntellix AG
Syntellix AG is a medical technology company based in Hanover. The company specializes in the research, development and marketing of bio-absorbable metal implants, i.e. second surgery to remove implants would no longer be required. The devices have all the properties and stability of metal, however, they are fully absorbed by the body and replaced by the body's own bone tissue. The company is currently active in 16 countries worldwide and has approval for the whole European Union and Singapore. Patients have already been fitted with Syntellix devices in more than 3,500 operations, and it was awarded with the German Award for innovation (Deutscher Innovationspreis).

papagei.com
Maschmeyer also founded papagei.com, a video language learning platform.

Orderbird
Orderbird is the provider of a cash register system used by restaurants. The system is based on iPad technology and used by more than 5,000 eateries in Germany, Switzerland and Austria. In the 4th quarter of 2014 Concardis (MasterCard) joined as new strategic investor. Orderbird received accolades from the Financial Times in 2012.

Blacklane
Maschmeyer first invested in Blacklane, a worldwide booking platform for chauffeur-driven limousines with taxi-like pricing, in January 2013. Blacklane was recognized as Germany's fastest growing tech startup in March 2015. Maschmeyer's investment company, ALSTIN, invested in Blacklane again in August 2016, in Blacklane's biggest funding round to date, along with previous investors Daimler, RI Digital Ventures and b-to-v.

nu3
nu3 is an e-commerce platform for nutritional supplements.

Consultant, author, speaker
Today, Carsten Maschmeyer also advises decision-makers on strategies in numerous businesses, e.g. large European banks and insurance companies. Due to his success, he is a very popular speaker in Germany, Austria and Switzerland, mostly on topics like entrepreneurship, investments, sales, communication, networking, marketing, success and mental power. Maschmeyer became a bestselling author through his book entitled "Selfmade - erfolg reich leben" which is about the fundamental rules of success. The book is presently in its 7th edition. Furthermore, his second book "Die Millionärsformel – Der Weg zur finanziellen Unabhängigkeit" also became a bestseller in the first few days following its publication.

Charity and donations
Maschmeyer is an honorary senator of the Leibniz University in Hanover and a freelance lecturer at the International School of Management in Munich. At both institutions, Maschmeyer finances scholarships. Motivated by his personal interest in psychology and neurology, he promotes the "Neurological Learning" project at the University of Hildesheim and co-founded the international "Neurobionic" foundation. He also finances a professorship at the Music College in Hanover. Moreover, Maschmeyer supports several charity projects and initiatives aimed at helping children. For example, he founded the "AWD Kinderhilfe", having paid all costs in order to ensure that every euro spent will be given to the projects, "Herz für Kinder". In recent years, he gave the largest single donation, €1 million, that has ever been received. He also donated a helicopter to the Order of Saint John (Bailiwick of Brandenburg), a voluntary humanitarian organization, and supports the ALS-Gala, Sean Penn's "J/P Haitian Relief Organization", Surgeon-Congress and HOPE Cape Town against AIDS, the Elton John AIDS Foundation. In 2015, Maschmeyer shared his private house in Hanover with two Syrian refugee families for several months in order to help them build new lives in Germany. He provides online-language learning programs to refugees for free.

Television career
Maschmeyer announced he would be joining the TV show Die Höhle der Löwen, produced by German TV channel VOX, as a potential investor in new ideas showcased on the programme. This is the German version of the US show Shark Tank. Entrepreneurs present their business ideas to five "lions" (or investors), who then invest their own money and in return receive shares in the business.

Legal

Bank Safra Sarasin
Maschmeyer was a litigant in a legal dispute against Bank Safra Sarasin, along with several prominent investors. Together with other investors, he invested €40 million in a fund (Sheridan fund) that was offered by Bank Safra Sarasin. Unbeknown to the investors, the fund was based on illegal tax refunds. After several proceedings, the bank refunded Maschmeyer.

MLP
As CEO of AWD, Maschmeyer's vision was a merger between AWD and MLP, a German financial advisory. In 2008, he held 26.74% of MLP-shares, however, the takeover failed. Afterwards, MLP accused Maschmeyer of having violated reputing obligations, but did not succeed in terms of their claim.

Personal life

Maschmeyer maintains residences in Munich and Hanover, Germany; Côte d'Azur, France and Beverly Hills, California, United States. He has been married to the German actress Veronica Ferres since 2014 and is the father of two sons from a previous marriage, and a stepdaughter. Maschmeyer has an art collection which includes works by Damien Hirst, Andreas Gursky, David Reed, Daniel Richter, Thomas Ruff, Steve McQueen, David LaChapelle, Anselm Kiefer and Igor Mitoraj.

References

Businesspeople from Lower Saxony
1959 births
Living people